Silke Schneider (born 1967) is a German lawyer and political official. In Germany, Schneider has worked as a judge, a chairman of the Regional Courts, a director of District Courts, and has been acting as the Secretary of state for Agriculture, Environment and Rural Areas for Schleswig-Holstein since 2014.

Biography 
Schneider studied jurisprudence in Cologne and Hamburg. In 1997 she became a judge at the district court in Lübeck, and was the chairman of the Lübeck Regional Court from 2006 to 2009. From 2008 to 2010, Schneider acted as an Equality Commissioner in the Ministry of Justice for Schleswig-Holstein.

After Schneider took the post of director of the Amtsgericht Bad Segeberg between 2009 and 2014, she was appointed Secretary of State for Agriculture, Environment and Rural Areas at the Ministry of Energy, Agriculture, Environment and Rural Areas of the Ministry of Energy, on 15 April 2014 by Minister Robert Habeck Landes Schleswig-Holstein in the cabinet of Albig.

She is a licensed mediator having graduated from the Free University of Berlin in 2014 with the thesis Confidentiality of mediation: Protection and limits through criminal and criminal procedural law.

Private life 
Silke Schneider is the mother of six children from two marriages. She was previously married to Hartmut Schneider, vice president of the Lübeck Regional Court.

References 

German women judges
20th-century German judges
21st-century German judges
Women federal government ministers of Germany
1967 births
Living people
20th-century women judges
21st-century women judges